Thambuli is a type of raita or buttermilk eaten in the Indian state of Karnataka. Thambuli, being a curd based cuisine, is consumed with rice. Tambuli is derived from Kannada word . (ತಂಪು+ಹುಳಿ ---->ತಂಬುಳಿ). Thampu meaning cool/cold. So thambuli is a cooling food. It is made mostly from many greens and carrot, beetroot like vegetables as their main ingredients. It is prepared by grinding the vegetable with the spices and then mixing it with yogurt. All ingredients are used raw, (as they are) without any cooking.

There are many varieties of Thumbuli: Menthe Thumbuli, shunti (ginger) thaumbuli, and various other herbal thambulis. The herbal thambuli is prepared with leaves like  (all of them grown in all over Karnataka).

Many different seasonal vegetables/herbs can be used in the preparation of thambulis, such as doddapatre leaves (ajwain leaves/karibevu leaves), coriander leaves, poppy seeds, curry leaves and so on. Various recipes for the same exist, with slight variations in the ingredients. Thambuli/Tambli is generally prepared mild and not spicy. Fundamentally, thambuli/tambli has a few simple whole spices, roasted and ground with seasonal vegetables or herbs (some with coconut) added to buttermilk/curds. Tambuli is another authentic Karnataka recipe.

References 

Karnataka cuisine
Sauces